Tyler Kettering (born July 24, 1984) is an American former professional soccer player who played as a goalkeeper.

He played college soccer at Gardner–Webb University, where he was a 4-year starter and 3-year captain.  When he graduated, he signed with Wilmington Hammerheads of USL Second Division.  He appeared in 10 matches (900 minutes) and posted 2 wins and 3 shutouts with 51 saves.  He was not retained by the team following the season.

Kettering signed a developmental contract to join Fire's 28-man roster for the 2008 season.

References

External links

Player profile at Gardner-Webb University

1984 births
Living people
American soccer players
Chicago Fire FC players
Southern California Seahorses players
USL League Two players
USL Second Division players
Wilmington Hammerheads FC players
Association football goalkeepers
Soccer players from Ohio